Club de Fútbol Sala Bisontes Castellón is a futsal club based in Castellón, city of the province of Castellón in the Spanish autonomous community of Valencian Community.

Its local pavilion is Ciutat de Castelló with a capacity of 6,000.

History
The club was founded in 1985 by the employees of the factory Macer. The club have had many names as:
Keralite Macer — (1989–90)
Macer Almazora — (1990–91)
Almazora — (1991–92)
Bisontes de Almazora — (1992–93)
Bisontes de Castellón — (1993–94)
Playas de Castellón — (1994–14)
Playas CD Castellón — (2015–16)
Bisontes de Castellón — (2016–)

In 2011–12 season finished at 16th position at final standings being consequently relegated. But were reinstated as Segunda División team due to vacant seats in that category.

In July 2013, LNFS revoked its Segunda División's licence after failing to pay the enrolment fee, so it was demoted to Tercera División for 2013–14 season. 

On 13 May 2016, the club is renamed again as Club de Fútbol Sala Bisontes Castellón.

Season to season

22 seasons in Primera División
2 season in Segunda División

Club honours

Division de Honor: 2
1999–2000, 2000–01
UEFA Futsal Cup: 2
2001–2002, 2002–2003
Futsal European Clubs Championship: 1
2000–2001
Supercopa de Espana: 1
2004

source: http://arquivo.pt/wayback/20091007004708/http://www.playascastellon.com/

Current squad

Notable former players 
  Alemão

References

External links
Official Website

Futsal clubs in Spain
Sport in Castellón de la Plana
 
Futsal clubs established in 1985
1985 establishments in Spain
Sports teams in the Valencian Community